There have been two organizations designated the 4400th Combat Crew Training Group in the United States Air Force:
 The 4400th Combat Crew Training Group at Langley Air Force Base, Virginia 12 March 1951 - 16 January 1954.
 The 4400th Combat Crew Training Group at Hurlburt Field, Florida 1962-1963.

Training groups of the United States Air Force
Four digit groups of the United States Air Force
Military units and formations established in 1951